Raguva is a small town in Panevėžys County, in northeastern Lithuania. According to the 2011 census, the town has a population of 533 people.

Esther Barsel was born in Raguva on 17 October 1924.

Gallery

References

Towns in Lithuania
Towns in Panevėžys County
Vilkomirsky Uyezd
Panevėžys District Municipality